Hajjiabad (also Romanized as Ḩājjīābād and Ḩājīābād) is a village in Mohr Rural District, in the Central District of Mohr County, Fars Province, Iran. At the 2006 census, its population was 448, in 95 families.

References 

Populated places in Mohr County